The Chinese Athletic Association (CAA) (中国田径协会) is the national governing body for the sport of athletics in the People's Republic of China. It became a member of the International Association of Athletics Federations in 1978 and is also a member of the Asian Athletics Association.

The headquarters is located at 2 Tiyuguan Road, Beijing; President: Duan Shijie, General Secretary: Du Zhaocai.

CAA was founded in Beijing in 1954. It is a non-governmental organization. The CAA has the corporate membership of the All-China Sports Federation. The CAA is a national sports association in charge of the athletic sports in China recognized by the China Olympic Committee.

Under the CAA there are seven committees, namely the Training Committee, the Tournament Committee, the Development Committee, the Publicity Committee, the Facility and Equipment Committee, the Medical Affairs Committee and the Secretariat. CAA also has 44 branches nationwide.

See also
 List of Chinese records in athletics
 China at the World Athletics Championships

References

External links

athletic.sport.org.cn

China
Federation
Members of the All-China Sports Federation
Athletics
National governing bodies for athletics
Sports organizations established in 1954